The Americas Zone is one of the three zones of regional Davis Cup competition in 2010.

In the Americas Zone there are four different groups in which teams compete against each other to advance to the next group.

Participating teams

Seeds

Other Nations

Draw

 and  relegated to Group III in 2011.
 promoted to Group I in 2011.

First round

Peru vs. El Salvador

Venezuela vs. Bolivia

Paraguay vs. Netherlands Antilles

Mexico vs. Guatemala

Second round

Venezuela vs. Peru

Paraguay vs. Mexico

Play-Offs

Bolivia vs. El Salvador

Guatemala vs. Netherlands Antilles

Third round

Venezuela vs. Mexico

External links
Davis Cup draw details

2